Kyle Helms (born April 21, 1986) is a Canadian-German professional ice hockey player. He is currently playing for Saale Bulls Halle in the third German division, the Oberliga.

Playing career
Helms played for the Streetsville Derbys (OPJHL) and the Cambridge Winter Hawks (MWJHL) in his native Canada, before moving to Germany in 2007. After spending the 2007-08 season with EV Landsberg, he joined fellow second-division side EV Ravensburg for the following two season.

He was set to join the Hamburg Freezers of the German top-flight Deutsche Eishockey Liga (DEL) for the 2010-11 campaign, but had his contract terminated before the season due to medical concerns: Helms had sustained a shoulder injury in January 2010. He signed with another DEL team, EHC München, instead and spent the 2010-11 season with the club.

From 2011 to 2013 he played for the Augsburger Panther in the Deutsche Eishockey Liga (DEL). In 2013, he moved to German DEL2 side EC Bad Nauheim, where he spent three years and left at the conclusion of the 2015-16 season. In May 2016, he signed with Heilbronner Falken of the German DEL2. Helms left the Heilbronn side after three years, signing with Oberliga team MEC Halle 04 in April 2019.

Personal life 
Helms' father is a native of Hameln, Germany.

References

External links

1986 births
Living people
Augsburger Panther players
Canadian ice hockey left wingers
Heilbronner Falken players
EHC München players
Ice hockey people from Ontario
Rote Teufel Bad Nauheim players